The Men's 3 metre springboard competition at the 2022 World Aquatics Championships was held on 27 and 28 June 2022.

Results
The preliminary round was started on 27 June at 09:00. The semifinal was started on 27 June at 16:00. The final was sheld on 28 June at 16:00.

Green denotes finalists

Blue denotes semifinalists

References

Men's 3 metre springboard